Ctenotus stuarti, also known commonly as the Point Stuart ctenotus or Stuart's ctenotus, is a species of skink, a lizard in the family Scincidae. The species is endemic to Australia.

Etymology
The specific name, stuarti, is in honor of Scottish explorer John McDouall Stuart, and also refers to the locality Point Stuart.

Geographic range
C. stuarti found in the Northern Territory in Australia.

Habitat
The preferred natural habitat of C. stuarti is forest.

Reproduction
C. stuarti is oviparous.

References

Further reading
Cogger HG (2014). Reptiles and Amphibians of Australia, Seventh Edition. Clayton, Victoria, Australia: CSIRO Publishings. xxx + 1,033 pp. .
Horner P (1995). "Two new species of Ctenotus (Reptilia: Scincidae) from Northern Territory". The Beagle 12: 75–88. (Ctenotus stuarti, new species).
Wilson, Steve; Swan, Gerry (2013). A Complete Guide to Reptiles of Australia, Fourth Edition. Sydney: New Holland Publishers. 522 pp. .

stuarti
Reptiles described in 1995
Taxa named by Paul Horner (herpetologist)